Huntsman's Leap is a deep, narrow and sheer-sided coastal chasm or geo developed in the Carboniferous Limestone of the Pembrokeshire Coast National Park, Pembrokeshire, Wales. Like the nearby Green Bridge of Wales and St Govan's Chapel, it is a popular visitor attraction which lies beside the Pembrokeshire Coast Path. The site lies within the eastern sector of the Ministry of Defence's Castlemartin military training area, but access for the public is normally available.

The name derives from local folklore, a hunter on horseback is said to have jumped from one side of the chasm to the other. On looking back and seeing the gap that he had jumped, he died of shock.

References

Coast of Pembrokeshire